Angelos Bible College is a Bible college in Portsmouth, Virginia. The college was founded by Dr. Allen R. McFarland senior pastor, Calvary Evangelical Baptist Church.  Angelos is a member of Association of Christian Schools International and American Association of Christian Colleges and Seminaries. Angelos is approved to receive educational benefits for veterans earning degrees at the college. The college graduated its first class in 2001.

References

External links 
 AngelosBibleCollege.org former official website from Archive.org

Christian universities and colleges in the United States
Baptist Christianity in Virginia
Baptist universities and colleges in the United States
Educational institutions established in 1984
1984 establishments in Virginia
Education in Portsmouth, Virginia
Bible colleges